Fillmore is a populated place in Bossier Parish, Louisiana, United States.

History
Thomas Dixon Connell built an inn here, The Connell Inn, around 1848, and the settlement was known as "Connell's Cross Road".  In 1852, the settlement and post office were renamed "Fillmore", in honor of U.S. President Millard Fillmore.

References

Unincorporated communities in Louisiana
Unincorporated communities in Bossier Parish, Louisiana
Unincorporated communities in Shreveport – Bossier City metropolitan area